Salvador – Deputado Luís Eduardo Magalhães International Airport , formerly called Dois de Julho International Airport and known by the Trade name Salvador Bahia Airport is the airport serving Salvador, Brazil. Since 16 June 1998, by Federal Law, the airport is named after Luís Eduardo Maron Magalhães (1955–1998), an influential politician of the state of Bahia.

It is operated by Vinci SA.

Some of its facilities are shared with the Salvador Air Force Base of the Brazilian Air Force.

History
The airport, originally called Santo Amaro do Ipitanga Airport, was established in 1925. In 1941 Panair do Brasil participating in the World War II efforts with the support of the American and Brazilian governments completely rebuilt the facility.

On 20 December 1955, the airport had its name changed for the first time: it became known as Dois de Julho International Airport, celebrating Bahia Independence Day. This is still the name by which the population of Salvador da Bahia call the facility. On 16 June 1998 the airport name was again changed to honor Luís Eduardo Maron Magalhães (1955–1998) an influential politician of the state of Bahia. This second change remains however controversial and there have been attempts to revert it. Since 2017 the concessionary has been using the Trade name Salvador Bahia Airport.

The airport is located in an area of more than 6 million square meters between sand dunes and native vegetation. The lush, bamboo-covered road to the airport has become one of the scenic attractions of Salvador da Bahia.

A brand new passenger terminal was opened in 1998, replacing an original outdated terminal. This new terminal continued to be upgraded and was completed by the end of year 2000. The main terminal, which includes a shopping mall has 69,400 m2, 11 jetways and a capacity to handle 6,000,000 passengers/year. Traffic has been growing at an average of 14% per year.

Previously operated by Infraero, on 16 March 2017, the concession of the facility was won by Vinci SA, for which it paid R$ 2,35 billions (€ 640 millions). The concession is for a period of 30 years. The new concessionary then planned to duplicate the passenger terminal.

On 26 April 2018, the Aeroporto station on Line 2 of the Salvador subway was opened to the public.

Airlines and destinations

Passenger

Cargo

Accidents and incidents

Accidents with fatalities
21 September 1944: A Panair do Brasil Lockheed Model 18 Lodestar registration PP-PBH crashed shortly after take-off from Salvador da Bahia. All 18 occupants died.

Access

A free shuttle bus runs every 15 minutes from 5am to 1am to Aeroporto station of Salvador subway, which connects to downtown Salvador at Lapa.

See also
List of airports in Brazil
Salvador Air Force Base

References

External links

Airports in Bahia
Airports established in 1925
Airfields of the United States Army Air Forces Air Transport Command on the South Atlantic Route